A side street is a street that intersects a main street and ends there.

Side Street or Streets may also refer to:

 Side Street (1929 film), a black-and-white talking movie featuring all three Moore brothers
 Side Streets (1933 film), a British drama film 
 Side Streets (1934 film), a romantic melodrama starring Aline MacMahon
 Side Street (1950 film), an American film noir directed by Anthony Mann
 Side Streets (1998 film), a Merchant Ivory film
 Sidestreet, a Canadian television drama series
 "Side Streets", a 2005 song by Saint Etienne from Tales from Turnpike House

See also
 Side Street Ramblers, a barbershop quartet